kREEPA is a group that perform electronic music and musical improvisation founded by John Richards and Hilary Jeffery in 2000. The group performs a type of industrial jazz and electro-noise.

Career
The group began with recordings of extended instrumental improvisations with starkly contrasting electronic textures. In 2000, the contrabass recorder player Cesar Villavicencio joined the group after meeting Jeffery in the Meta Orchestra at Dartington International Summer School. Recordings continued throughout 2001 with Villavicencio and the British saxophonist Paul Dunmall. These original recordings became part of two limited edition CD-R releases. During 2002, kREEPA collaborated with the American dancer, choreographer and designer Aurora Corsano. 

This work included a residency at the Studio for Electro-Instrumental Music (STEIM), which culminated in a performance at the Frascati Theatre in Amsterdam with Paul Dunmall. During their stay at STEIM, kREEPA helped initiate the OIK project that involved the hacking of commercially available hardware to create economic musical interfaces.

Richards developed the kreepback instrument that is an assemblage of do-it-yourself electronic devices and audio hardware patched together to create a feedback labyrinth. The first realisation of the kreepback instrument used purely a feedback network in the music software Max/MSP that was controlled by an automated interface. This instrument features on the album Document 1, Kraakgeluiden on the Unsounds label. He then turned to a more modular approach that included bespoke and appropriated hardware. 

Jeffery’s tromboscillator combines and mutates the trombone with oscillators, ring modulators, filters and delay lines. Jeffery cites the piece Wind Shadows by Alvin Lucier influencing the development of the instrument. The initial tromboscillator was developed in Max/MSP. In 2006, Jeffery moved to a discrete analogue tromboscillator built by Tom Bugs.    

kREEPA have performed internationally with various line-ups. In 2004, the group took part in a concert funded by Arts Council England and the Performing Rights Society Foundation with Walter Fabeck at Trinity Buoy Wharf in London with a kRUISE taking the audience along the Thames to and from the venue. Other notable performances include the Logos Foundation, kraakgeluiden, Supersonic, and Sónar. 

Since 2004, kREEPA have worked closely with Nicholas Bullen (founder of Napalm Death and Scorn) and Bullen’s group Black Galaxy. kREEPA have also released material on Bullen’s label Monium. Other collaborations have been with Tom Bugs, whom Jeffery has also performed with as a duo. The pseudonym aka kREEPA has also been used by John Richards for his solo performances.

References
www.discogs.com/artist/Kreepa a database of music information
www.sara.uea.ac.uk Sonic Arts Research Archive

External links
www.monium.org.uk
www.subdist.com Distribution of music by kREEPA
www.steim.org Studio for Electro-Instrumental Music, Amsterdam

British electronic music groups
Musical improvisation
Noise musical groups